Joseph Godfrey (January 1894 – January 1977), commonly known as Joby Godfrey, was an English professional footballer who played in the Football League for Birmingham, Coventry City, Manchester City and Merthyr Town. He played as a forward.

Godfrey was born in Waleswood, near Rotherham. He scored freely in wartime competition, but was unable to settle when the Football League began again. He scored on his debut for Birmingham in the Second Division on the opening day of the first post-war season, in a 4–1 home win against Hull City, but by the end of that season he had moved to Merthyr Town via both Coventry City and Manchester City. After a year with Merthyr, in which he rarely appeared for the first team, he moved into non-league football back in his native Yorkshire.

References

1894 births
1977 deaths
Footballers from Rotherham
English footballers
Association football forwards
Kiveton Park F.C. players
Beighton Miners Welfare F.C. players
Nottingham Forest F.C. players
Birmingham City F.C. players
Coventry City F.C. players
Manchester City F.C. players
Merthyr Town F.C. players
Rotherham Town F.C. (1899) players
Denaby United F.C. players
Mexborough Athletic F.C. players
English Football League players
Place of death missing